David G. Williams (November 25, 1840August 26, 1903) was a Welsh American immigrant, miller, and Republican politician.  He was a member of the Wisconsin State Assembly, representing Columbia County during the 1903 session.

Biography

Williams was born in Denbighshire, Wales, and his family emigrated to Wisconsin in 1850, settling in Delafield. During the Civil War, he served in the 32nd Wisconsin Infantry Regiment. He served as president of the village of Cambria, Wisconsin, for five years and was a member of the school board for six years. He served as sheriff of Columbia County, Wisconsin, from 1885 to 1887.

Williams was elected to the Assembly in 1902, and he introduced a bill to prohibit marriage between whites and blacks, known as the Williams Bill. He was a life-long Republican.

Williams died in Cambria on August 26, 1903, while still a member of the Assembly. His death was a result of blood poisoning caused by a rat bite.

References

External links

1840 births
1903 deaths
Welsh emigrants to the United States
People from Columbia County, Wisconsin
Republican Party members of the Wisconsin State Assembly
People of Wisconsin in the American Civil War
Union Army non-commissioned officers